Argyrops is a genus of fishes belonging to the family Sparidae.

The species of this genus are found in the coasts of Indian Ocean and near Australia.

Species:

Argyrops bleekeri 
Argyrops caeruleops 
Argyrops filamentosus 
Argyrops flavops 
Argyrops megalommatus 
Argyrops notialis 
Argyrops spinifer

References

Sparidae
Perciformes genera